The Illinois circuit courts are state courts of the U.S. state of Illinois. They are trial courts of original jurisdiction. There are 24 judicial circuits in the state, each comprising one or more of Illinois' 102 counties. The jurisdiction of six of these circuits courts are solely within the confines of a single county; these are Cook, Kane, Will, DuPage, Lake, and McHenry (all Chicago metropolitan area counties). The other 18 circuits each contain between two and 12 counties.

The circuit court has general jurisdiction and can decide, with few exceptions, any kind of case. (The exceptions are redistricting of the Illinois General Assembly and the ability of the governor of Illinois to serve or resume office.) The circuit court also shares jurisdiction with the Supreme Court of Illinois (the state supreme court) to hear cases relating to revenue, mandamus, prohibition, and habeas corpus. However, if the supreme court chooses to exercise its jurisdiction over these cases, the circuit court may not decide them. The circuit court also reviews administrative decisions of certain state agencies.

There are two kinds of judges in the circuit court: circuit judges and associate judges. Circuit judges are elected for six years, may be retained by voters for additional six-year terms, and can hear any kind of case. Circuit judges are generally elected on a circuit-wide basis or from the county where they reside. (In the Circuit Court of Cook County, which contains Chicago and is the largest of the 24 circuits in Illinois, circuit judges are elected from the entire county or as resident judges from each of the fifteen subcircuits within the county.) Associate judges are appointed by circuit judges, under Supreme Court rules, for four-year terms. An associate judge can hear any case, except criminal cases punishable by a prison term of one year or more, unless the associate judge has received approval from the Supreme Court to hear other criminal cases.

Circuit judges in a circuit elect one of their members to serve as chief judge of the circuit court. Cases may be assigned to general or specialized divisions by the chief judge who has general administrative authority in the circuit, subject to the overall administrative authority of the Supreme Court.

See also
Judiciary of Illinois

References
 Caseload Statistics

Illinois state courts
Illinois
Courts and tribunals with year of establishment missing